Taxonus terminalis is a species of common sawfly in the family Tenthredinidae.

References

Further reading

External links

 NCBI Taxonomy Browser, Taxonus terminalis

Tenthredinidae
Insects described in 1824